Hammermill Paper Company is an American paper manufacturer originally founded in 1898 as the Ernst R. Behrend Company.  The company was purchased in 1986 by International Paper Company, where the namesake survives as a brand of paper.

History
Hammermill Paper Company was founded in 1898 by the brothers Ernst, Otto, and Bernard Behrend and their father Moritz Behrend in Erie, Pennsylvania.  Ernst served as President and Otto, secretary.  Construction of their first paper mill, in Erie, began that same year.

Behrend changed the name of the company before the first mill even opened in honor of his father's papermills in Germany.  The company expanded by buying a mill in Oswego, New York, that was making copier paper exclusively for Xerox.  In the 1960s, mills were acquired in Lock Haven, Pennsylvania and near Selma, Alabama.  In 1962, they bought the Strathmore Paper Company. After a failed takeover by Paul Bilzerian and brothers William and Earle I. Mack (sons of New Jersey real estate developer H. Bert Mack), Hammermill was purchased in 1986, by International Paper Company, with customer services and operations moving to their Memphis headquarters in 1988.

Innovations
 1952:  Hammermill developed the neutracel pulping process.
 1954:  In a cooperative venture with the Haloid-Xerox Company, they created the first xerographic copier papers.
 1986:  Hammermill became the first manufacturer to market paper optimized for laser printers.

References

External links
 Hammermill brand at International Paper
 International Paper on hoovers.com

International Paper
Pulp and paper companies of the United States
1898 establishments in Pennsylvania
Manufacturing companies established in 1898
Defunct pulp and paper companies
Manufacturing companies disestablished in 1986